Ricardo Régis Aparecido de Lima (born February 20, 1994) is a Brazilian footballer who plays as a defender for Vila Nova.

Career
Lima began his career in 2013 with União São João.

References

1994 births
Living people
Brazilian footballers
Brazilian expatriate footballers
Association football defenders
Uruguayan Primera División players
Campeonato Brasileiro Série D players
União São João Esporte Clube players
União Agrícola Barbarense Futebol Clube players
Clube Atlético Metropolitano players
Club Atlético River Plate (Montevideo) players
Madureira Esporte Clube players
Associação Atlética Aparecidense players
Clube Atlético Linense players
Brazilian expatriate sportspeople in Uruguay
Expatriate footballers in Uruguay